Narragh and Reban East (sometimes spelled Rheban) is a barony in County Kildare, Ireland.

Etymology
The barony takes its name from the village of Narragh (from Irish an fhorrach, "the meeting-place") and Rheban Castle (ríogh-bábhún, "king's bawn").

Location
The barony of Narragh and Reban East is located in southeast County Kildare.

History
Narragh and Reban East were part of the ancient lands of the Ua Tuathail (O'Tooles) before the 13th century, retaken in the 14th. An Uí Garrchon branch is also noted here. There were originally two separate baronies, united by 1572, and then divided into west and east baronies before 1807.

List of settlements

Below is a list of settlements in Narragh and Reban East:
Ballitore
Narraghmore
Timolin

References

Baronies of County Kildare